Twyford C of E High School is a co-educational Church of England Academy school located in Acton, west London. It consists of just under 1500 pupils aged 11–18 (with over 500 students in the Sixth Form) and has specialisms in music, science and languages. On 1 October 2011, the school converted to academy status and is now operated by the Twyford Church of England Academies Trust. It has been rated as "outstanding" by the Schools Inspection Agency, Ofsted.

History
The name "Twyford" comes from the Twyford Brook that runs underground near the Elms, and literally means "Two Fords". This same brook is connected to Twyford Abbey in the West Twyford area of Ealing.

Twyford High School was purchased from the London Borough of Ealing by the London Diocesan Board for Schools and established in 1981 and is one of a family of 13 LDBS secondary schools within the city. The school opened as the result of a concerted campaign by local parents.

One of the school buildings, The Elms, is the oldest surviving building in Acton. It was built by Charles Morren in 1735 as a Baroque country villa and has been occupied by various wealthy citizens. In 1954 it ceased to be a private home. There were plans to demolish it but the former local council, Middlesex County Council, opposed it and bought the house to be used as a school. An extension was added to house new classrooms. In 1981 it was taken over by the new Twyford C of E High School.

On 1 October 2011, the school converted to academy status, meaning that it is independent of local authority control, and directly funded by the Dept of Education. The school is administered by the Twyford Church of England Academies Trust.

School structure
Twyford is organised into year groups each containing seven tutor groups, which are also members of the school's seven houses: Truro, Wells, York, Fountains, Ripon, Durham and Canterbury. Each tutor group has its own Form Representative, Chapel Ambassador and Sport, Enterprise, Music, STEM and MFL representatives .

House system
Each pupil is a member of one of the seven schools houses at Twyford. House representatives meet at a council to represent the views of students in each house and year.

Houses are named after famous cathedrals or abbeys in England and each is associated with a colour.

The initial of each House joins to create the full name of the school (TWYFORD CE HIGH SCHOOL), with 'O' being excluded for historical reasons.

Notable former pupils 

Simon Reeve (1974-) British documentarian and Journalist.
Asma al-Assad (1975–), the wife of the current Syrian President Bashar al-Assad and the current First lady of Syria.
Lashana Lynch (1987-), actress.
Myles Hippolyte (1994–), footballer.
Harry Podmore (1994–), cricketer.
Michael Klass (1999–), footballer.
Harry Baker (poet) (1992-), poet and comedian

Controversies 
In February 2014, several Sixth Former students who attended the school were discovered to be using class A drugs at parties. The school has a zero-tolerance policy on drugs and although the actions took place off the grounds, parents of those involved were individually contacted and the information was passed to the police. A similar incident occurred in 2016.

Gallery

See also 
 William Perkin Church of England High School
 Twyford Church of England Academies Trust

References

External links
Twyford CofE High School website
Twyford Academies Trust

Academies in the London Borough of Ealing
Church of England secondary schools in the Diocese of London
Secondary schools in the London Borough of Ealing
Acton, London